This is a list of major corporations headquartered in the metropolitan area of Pittsburgh, Pennsylvania.

Fortune 500 companies based in Pittsburgh
There are eight Fortune 500 companies headquartered in the Pittsburgh metropolitan area. 
120 PNC Financial Services (financial)
220 PPG Industries (industrial)
226 Howmet Aerospace (industrial)
245 Wesco International (industrial)
254 Viatris (pharmaceuticals)
310 U.S. Steel (industrial)
330 Alcoa (metals/mining)
362 Dick's Sporting Goods (retail/consumer goods)
388 Wabtec (industrial)

Other public companies
Allegheny Technologies (industrial)
American Eagle Outfitters (retail/consumer goods)
Ampco Pittsburgh (industrial)
Ansys (technology)
Arconic (industrial)
Atlas Energy (energy)
Aurora (technology)
Calgon Carbon (industrial)
Consol Energy (energy)
Duolingo (technology)
DynaVox (technology)
Education Management Corporation (education)
EQT (Energy)
Federated Investors (financial)
F.N.B. Corporation (financial)
GNC (retail/consumer goods)
Horsehead (industrial)
Kennametal (industrial)
Koppers (industrial)
L.B. Foster Company (industrial)
Mine Safety Appliances (industrial)
Nova Chemicals (industrial)
rue21 (retail)
Viatris (medical)
Westinghouse Electric Company (industrial)

Large private companies
4moms (juvenile/robotics consumer goods)
84 Lumber (retail/consumer goods)
American Bridge Company (industrial)
Argo AI (technology)
Buchanan, Ingersoll & Rooney (law firm)
Centimark (industrial contractor)
Eat'n Park (retail/consumer goods)
Farmers and Merchants Bank of Western Pennsylvania
Giant Eagle (retail/consumer goods)
Guru.com
K&L Gates (law firm)
NexTier Bank
Pitt Ohio Express (services)
Reed Smith (law firm)
Vector Security (commercial/residential security)
Vocelli Pizza (retail/consumer goods)
Wexford Health Sources (healthcare)
Zambelli Fireworks

Nonprofit corporations
Allegheny Health Network (healthcare)
Duquesne University (education)
Highmark Health (third largest integrated health care delivery and financing system in the nation; parent company of Highmark Inc. and Allegheny Health Network)
Highmark Inc. (healthcare)
SAE International (professional association)
University of Pittsburgh Medical Center (healthcare)
The Washington Hospital (healthcare)

Other major companies
American Thermoplastic Company (industrial)
Ariba (formerly Freemarkets)
Covestro (chemicals)
Dollar Bank (financial)
DQE (energy)
Eaton (electrical)
FedEx Ground (services)
Fox Learning Systems (e-learning)
Heyl & Patterson Inc. (industrial)
LANXESS (industrial)
Laurel Networks
Medrad Inc. (medical)
Mine Safety Appliances (industrial)
Niche (technology)
Oxford Development Company
Reich Publishing and Marketing
StarKist (retail/consumer goods)
IDI Consulting (technology)

References

 
Pittsburgh
Pittsburgh-related lists